Yangguang is a town in Tonghai County, Yuxi, Yunnan. , it administers Yangguang Residential Community and the following ten villages:
Yunlong Village
Gucheng Village
Daxin Village
Zhenhai Village
Yiguangshao Village
Xingyi Village
Majiawan Village
Yanghaigou Village
Wunaoshan Village
Luofeng Village

References

Tonghai County
Township-level divisions of Yuxi
Towns of Yunnan